Kolpi Pimpari is a village in Dharur block, Beed District in Maharashtra

References

Villages in Beed district